Roag is a 2022 Pakistani television drama serial produced by Moomal Productions and directed by Misbah Khalid. It features Adeel Chaudhary, Areej Mohyudin and Arez Ahmed in lead roles.

Plot 
A tale revolving around the ongoing predicament of feudalism and Muskaan, a girl like many that suffers at the hand of it. Muskaan tackles a series of trials and tribulations thrown towards her simply due to her gender and rises above them towards independence and empowerment.

Cast 
 Adeel Chaudhary as Shazeb: Ex Husband of Tabassum & Husband of Muskaan. Cousin of Rehan, Liaba, Alishba and Muskaan.
 Areej Mohyudin as Muskaan: widowed of Rehan & Wife of Shazeb
 Arez Ahmed as Rehan: Muskaan's former husband. Cousin of Shahzeb.
 Babar Ali as Bilal: Muskaan's father. Qamar Jahan's eldest brother 
 Saima Qureshi as Qamar Jahan: Bilal's sister. Muskaan, Rehan and Shahzeb's aunt.
 Manzoor Qureshi as Bilal's and Qamar Jahan's father
 Hafsa Tariq Butt as Laiba: Sister to Alishba and Rehan. Ibad’s wife.
 Mariam Tiwana as Alishba: sister of Liaba and Rehan. widower of Anas
 Raima Khan as Tabassum, former wife of Shazeb
 Kasim Khan as Anas Abbas: Alishba's husband. Rehan and Muskaan's University friend
 Tabbasum Arif as Anas' mother & Alisba's former mother-in-law
 Subhan Awan as Ibad
 Adnan Jillani
 Salma Asim

References 

Pakistani drama television series
Hum TV original programming
2022 Pakistani television series debuts